Adavale is a rural town and locality in the Shire of Quilpie, Queensland, Australia. By 2021, the population was down to 72.

Geography
It is roughly in the centre of the locality.

Between Adavale and Yaraka is Yapunyah waterhole.

The town is only accessible along a gravel road from Charleville in the east, Quilpie in the south and Blackall in the north.

Adavale has the following mountains:

 Cave Hill 
 Mount Bullock 
 Mount Prara 
 Winbin Hill 
There are a number of protected areas within the locality:

 part of Idalia National Park in the north of the locality
 Hell Hole Gorge National Park in the west of the locality
 Mariala National Park in the east of the locality

History

The town is named after Ada Constance Stevens (wife of  Ernest James Stevens). The Stevens family had the Tintinchilla (later Milo) pastoral run in the area. There is a story that the origin of the name is that  Ada lost her hat veil (Ada-veil) where the Milo road crosses Blackwater Creek.

Town and suburban lots in the town of Adavale were sold on 9 February 1881 at Charleville.

Adavale Post Office opened on 1 January 1881 and closed in 1991.

Milo Station Provisional School opened circa 1888  and closed circa 1891. It reopened as Milo Provision School circa 1902 and closed circa 1905.

Adavale Provisional School opened on 8 October 1888. On 1 January 1909, it became Adavale State School. It closed on 31 December 1968. The school was on Nelson Street.

From 1889 to 1930, Adavale was the seat of local government, initially called Adavale Division and later the Shire of Adavale. The town was a thriving centre but, in 1917, the Western railway line did not come to the town as expected but passed further to the south where the new town of Quilpie was created along the railway line, and soon became the major town in the region while Adavale diminished. In 1930, it was decided that the seat of local government should move from Adavale to Quilpie and the Shire of Adavale was renamed the Shire of Quilpie.St Eugene Catholic Church was opened on Wednesday 5 May 1954 by Bishop William Brennan. The church was originally located on the corner of Skinner and Shepherd Streets. In 1963, it was badly damaged in a flood. It was demolished and rebuilt at that site in 1964. It was later relocated to McKinlay Street. The church has closed and the building has been sold.

By 2021, the population was down to 72.

Education 
There are no schools in Adavale nor nearby; the nearest schools are in Quilpie. Distance education and boarding schools are other options.

Facilities 
Adavale Cemetery is on Patricia Downs Road north of the town.

Adavale Police Station is in Shepherd Street.

Adavale SES Facility is on the eastern corner of Mckinlay Street and Blackwater Street.

Attractions 
Emmet Pocket Lookout is in the Idalia National Park and offers panoramic views over the park's northern boundaries to the surrounding plains.

References

External links

 
 

Towns in Queensland
South West Queensland
Populated places established in 1880
1880 establishments in Australia
Shire of Quilpie
Localities in Queensland